PTDOS or Processor Technology Disk Operating System is an operating system created in the late 1970s for computers using the Intel 8080 microprocessor and the Processor Technology Helios II Disk Memory System.

Commands 
The following list of commands is supported by PTDOS 1.4.

 EDIT
 EDT3
 ASSM
 DEBUG
 DO
 DISKCOPY
 RECOVER
 FILES
 FREE?
 SYST
 OPEN?
 COPY
 IMAGE
 BLDUTIL
 EXTRACT
 KILL
 RENAME
 RETYPE
 REATR
 XREF
 DUMP
 PRINT
 RNUM
 SAVE
 GET
 CREATE
 OPEN
 READ
 WRITE
 CLOSE
 SPACE
 RANDOM
 SEEK
 ENDF
 SETIN
 SETOUT
 SET
 EXEC
 ZIP
 CONFIGR
 OUT
 BASC5
 FOCAL
 TREK80

References

External links
Sol 20 site – This computer used PTDOS when a Helios II disk drive was installed.

Disk operating systems
1978 software